François Faillu (17 May 1900 – 1 February 1974) was a French racing cyclist. He rode in the 1926 Tour de France.

References

1900 births
1974 deaths
French male cyclists
Place of birth missing